Pazo dos Deportes Paco Paz is a multi-purpose sports arena in Ourense, Galicia, Spain.

Founded in 1988, it is owned by the Deputación de Ourense.

References

External links
Official website (in Galician language)

Basketball venues in Spain
Sports venues in Galicia (Spain)
Sports venues completed in 1988
Sport in Ourense